The Blackwater River is located in the Buller District of New Zealand. It is the name given to the lower reaches of the Big River, from its junction with the Blackwater Creek to its outflow into the Māwheraiti (Little Grey) River. It joins with the similar-sized Snowy River  before its junction with the Māwheraiti.

References

Buller District
Rivers of the West Coast, New Zealand
Rivers of New Zealand